The 2004 season of Úrvalsdeild was the 93rd season of league football in Iceland. FH won their first title. KA and recently promoted Víkingur were relegated.

Final league position

Results
Each team played every opponent once home and away for a total of 18 matches.

Top goalscorers

Sources
RSSSF.com

Úrvalsdeild karla (football) seasons
1
Iceland
Iceland